Blythe is a fashion doll, about 28 cm (11 inch) tall, with an oversized head and large eyes that change color with the pull of a string. It was created in 1972 and was initially only sold for one year in the United States by toy company Kenner (later purchased by Hasbro). In 2001 the Japanese toy company Takara began producing new editions of Blythe dolls. There is a network of hobbyists who customize the doll for resale and create clothing and shoes for Blythe. Enthusiasts share photographs of their work and other types of dolls on the Internet.

History 
Blythe was created in the early seventies by designer Allison Katzman at Marvin Glass and Associates and bought and produced in the United States in 1972 by the now-defunct toy company Kenner. Blythe dolls were only sold for one year in the U.S. (produced in Hong Kong) and also in the UK, Australia and Japan, during 1972. Over time the original "Kenner" Blythe dolls acquired a cult following of collectors and eventually, photographers.

In mid-1991, Hasbro purchased Tonka, which acquired Kenner Parker Toys, Inc. in 1987. Since then, all the intellectual properties are owned by Hasbro.

In 1997, New York TV and video producer Gina Garan was given a 1972 Kenner Blythe by a friend and began using it to practice her photographic skills. She began taking her Blythe everywhere with her and took hundreds of photos. In 1999, she was introduced to CWC's Junko Wong by artist and illustrator, Jeffrey Fulvimari who brought Blythe to the attention of Parco and toy executives.  In 2000, Gina published her first book of Blythe photography with Chronicle Books, This is Blythe. In 2001, Hasbro (the current trademark and license owner) gave Takara of Japan and CWC a license to produce the New Edition of Blythe (Neo Blythe). Blythe was used in a television advertising campaign by Parco, the fashion branch of Seibu Department Stores in Japan and was an instant hit.

In 2003 Blythe was the subject in a segment on the VH1 special, I Love the '70s, where she was said to look like either "Barbie with encephalitis" or "Christina Ricci" among other things. The success in Japan led Hasbro to issue a license to Ashton-Drake Galleries in 2004 to sell Blythe replica dolls in the United States, where the doll became a niche product in a marginal market, selling largely to adults. In spring 2009, Alexander McQueen launched a fashion line for Target with an ad campaign featuring Blythe dolls. In 2010, Hasbro began releasing their version of Blythe as a part of the Littlest Pet Shop toy line.

In 2021 the last Takara Neo Blythe was produced.  In 2022 Good Smile Company became the manufacturer of Blythe dolls under the production helm of Cross World Connections.

Doll releases 
There are three sizes of Blythe dolls: the original 28 cm (1/6 scale) full-sized dolls, the 11.2 cm "Petite Blythe" from Takara and the "Middie Blythe" of about 20 cm. Only full-sized dolls have color-changing eyes. The first Petite dolls were keychains, and after some time the design was changed so the Petite eyes would close when the doll was laid down. The Middie Blythes eyes can turn to the sides and her head can twist around. Older dolls are sought after in the collectors market, and can sell for as high as several thousand dollars for an original Kenner doll to a thousand dollars or more for the first edition Neo dolls from Takara.

Original Kenner dolls
In 1972 Kenner released versions of the doll with four hair colors in the U.S., a brunette with chunky bangs, a sidepart brunette, a darker brunette with thinner bangs, a sidepart blonde, a red head with bangs, and a sidepart redhead. Twelve different outfits were released as well, along with four brightly colored wigs. The dolls were also released in Japan in 1972 by Tomy under the brand name Mahou no Hitomi Ai Ai Chan. The outfits and the box design were completely different from the ones released in other countries and are extremely rare. They were also sold in the UK by Palitoy and in Australia by Toltoys both sister companies to Kenner under General Mills

Takara

Beginning in 2001, Takara first released new Blythe dolls sporadically, but then began releasing new versions of Blythe each month. Under the creative direction of Junko Wong, CWC has produced 207 Neo Blythes, 211 Petites, and 17 of the newest addition to the Blythe line: the Middie Blythe dolls.  Every one of these Blythes were exhibited at Parco Factory at the 10th Anniversary from June–July 2011. Newer releases of the Petite Blythe dolls have "sleepy eyes" and bendable bodies.  The Middies' heads tilt and their eyes look left and right without changing color.  

The bodies of the full-size dolls vary depending on the time of the release. Early releases in 2001-2002 used the body of the Licca doll. In June 2002, in commemoration of 1 year of Blythe releases by Takara/CWC, the doll Miss Anniversary was released featuring the "Excellent Body" that was quite similar to the original Blythe released by Kenner. Early dolls also had a glossy surface texture, but some had matte face too. 

The earliest face molds of the reproduction Blythe dolls are referred to as BL. Two more face molds followed the BL mold, the Excellent mold, or EBL, and the Superior mold, or SBL, in 2003. In 2006 a new face mold, the Radiant mold or RBL, was introduced to look more Kenner-like, including slightly wider eyes. In 2009 another new face mold, the Fairest mold or FBL, was released with matte texture and smaller eye holes. The BL and EBL mold are actually the same mold. The difference in the EBL mold were important internal changes to make the eye mechanism more resistant. In 2013, due to wearing in the Radiance mold, or RBL, a new mold called Radiance+, or RBL+, was released and it's supposed to look exactly like the Radiance mold. Some changes were made in the eye mechanism as well, it became a lot lighter and easier to change the eyes compared to older releases.

By 2013, Hasbro left the Petite Blythes behind to new redesigned doll which seemed to be the end of the collaboration between the brands, despite the doll still being called Blythe, the Blythe logo was no longer used. In December 2012 Takara/CWC released the Petite Blythe Suri Tebya Lyublyu after 2 years since the Petite Blythe Birthday Party Surprise.

Good Smile Company 

From July 2021, Good Smile Company began manufacturing and distributing "Blythe" doll products. The copyright and license (intellectual property rights) for Blythe will continue to belong to American toy manufacturer Hasbro and Cross World Connections will continue to handle the creative production of the Blythe series. There is no major changes to the specifications or designs of the dolls, but there will be a few other changes such as Face and body parts will be manufactured using new molds, "Blythe" products will be recommended for ages 15 & up.

Other incarnations 

Ashton-Drake Galleries produced nearly exact replicas of the 5 original Kenner dolls in 2005-2006, along with replicas based on the original Kenner outfits. The first release had skin-tones with a slight green tint. A second release in 2007 was less green and more peach-pink. Both releases have a matte surface texture. Ashton Drake in total released 12 different full-sized Blythe dolls, but ceased production in 2008.

In 2010, Hasbro released the Blythe Loves Littlest Pet Shop line as a part of their 2004 incarnation of the Littlest Pet Shop toy line, with Blythe dolls as petsitters for their animal toys in the aforementioned toy line. Blythe stars as a protagonist in the Littlest Pet Shop Presents animated shorts that were produced by Cosmic Toast Studios and released online by Hasbro (voice unknown). Another incarnation of the character, named Blythe Baxter (voiced by Ashleigh Ball), stars in the 2012 Littlest Pet Shop animated television series, as well as its related shorts (not to be confused with the Cosmic Toast shorts), that were produced by Hasbro Studios and DHX Media.

See also 
 Asian fashion doll
 Ball-jointed doll

Notes

References

External links 

  by CWC

Japanese fashion
Fashion dolls
Hasbro products